Robert K. Jaedicke (February 10, 1929 – May 24, 2020) was an American academic. He was the dean of the Stanford Graduate School of Business from 1983 to 1990. He was the Philip H. Knight Professor of Accounting at GSB.

External Links 

 "Robert K. Jaedicke: An Oral History," Stanford Historical Society Oral History Program, 2003.

References

2020 deaths
University of Washington alumni
University of Minnesota alumni
Stanford University Graduate School of Business faculty
Business school deans
1929 births